The Biddeford Orphans were a minor league baseball team based in Biddeford, Maine in 1907 and 1908. Preceded by the 1885 Biddeford Clamdiggers, Biddeford teams played as members of the 1885 Eastern New England League and the Maine State League in 1907 and 1908, hosting home games at St. Louis Park.

History
Minor league baseball began in Biddeford, Maine in 1885. The Biddeford Clamdiggers became members of the 1885 Independent level Eastern New England League. The five–team league schedule consisted of an 80–game season, with each team playing 20 games against each of the other four. On July 17, 1885, Biddeford had a record of 13–20 when the franchise disbanded and relocated to Newburyport, Massachusetts to complete the season. Playing under manager Irwin, the Biddeford/Newburyport team had a 25–55 overall record, placing 5th and last in the league standings, finishing 23.5 games behind 1st place Lawrence.

The 1907 Biddeford Orphans resumed play as members of the Maine State League, which reformed as an eight–team Class D level league. The "Orphans" moniker corresponds to Biddeford being home in the era to the Sisters of Mercy Orphanage. Biddeford began play in the 1907 season alongside fellow members from Augusta, Maine (Augusta Senators), Bangor, Maine (Bangor Cubs), Lewiston, Maine (Lewiston), Manchester, New Hampshire (Manchester), Portland, Maine (Pine Tree Capers), a second team in Portland (Portland Blue Sox) and Waterville, Maine (Waterville).

Biddeford continued play as the 1907 Maine State League began games on May 24, 1907. The league lost several franchises before the season concluded. Both Manchester and Waterville folded in June, with Augusta and Lewiston folding after.

With a 30–27 record, Biddeford placed 2nd in the final 1907 standings, finishing 6.5 games behind the 1st place Bangor Cubs under managers Charlie Allen and John Guiney. Bangor had a 47–31 final record, followed by the Biddeford Orphans, Portland Blue Sox (39–41) and Pine Tree Capers (27–32) in the 1907 final standings. The Augusta Senators (27–28), Lewiston (24–23), Manchester (1–7) and Waterville (8–14) all folded before the completion of the season.

In 1908, Biddeford continued play under new manager Bernie McGraw as Maine State League games began play on June 10, 1908. During the season, Pine Tree and York Beach both disbanded on July 19, 1908 and when the Portland Blue Sox disbanded on August 28, 1908, the Maine State League permanently folded. The Portland Blue Sox were in 1st place with a 32–20 record, followed the Bangor White Sox (31–22), Lewiston/Augusta (20–26) and Biddeford (18–30) in the standings. However, since Portland folded, the Bangor White Sox were awarded the 1908 Maine State League championship.

The Maine State League permanently folded following the 1908 season. Biddleford, Maine has not hosted another minor league team.

The ballpark
The Biddeford Orphans were noted to have played home games at St. Louis Field in 1907 and 1908. St. Louis Field is still in use today as a public park with ballfields. It is located at 284 Hill Street Biddeford, Maine.

Timeline

Year–by–year records

Notable alumni

Frank Beck (1885)
Kid Butler (1885)
Artie Clarke (1885)
Charlie Fischer (1885)
John Fox (1885)
Jim Halpin (1885)
John Hanna (1885)
Pat Hartnett (1885)
John Irwin (1885)
Michael McDermott (1885)
Jim McKeever (1885)
Hank Morrison (1885)
Henry Mullin (1885)
Mike Slattery (1885)
Guerdon Whiteley (1885)

See also
Biddeford (minor league baseball) players

References

External links
 Baseball Reference

Professional baseball teams in Maine
Defunct baseball teams in Maine
Baseball teams established in 1907
Baseball teams disestablished in 1908
Maine State League teams
Sports in Biddeford, Maine
1908 disestablishments in Maine
1907 establishments in Maine